Mustapha Yaghcha (born 7 November 1952) is a retired Moroccan football defender.

Career
Yaghcha played club football for Difaa El Jadida in the Botola. He also played for CS Chênois and Servette FC in the Swiss Super League.

Yaghcha played for the Morocco national football team at the 1972 Summer Olympics.

In 2006, he was selected by CAF as one of the best 200 African football players of the last 50 years.

References

1949 births
Living people
Moroccan footballers
Association football defenders
Difaâ Hassani El Jadidi players
CS Chênois players
Servette FC players
Botola players
Swiss Super League players
Olympic footballers of Morocco
Morocco international footballers
Footballers at the 1972 Summer Olympics
1978 African Cup of Nations players
Moroccan expatriate footballers
Moroccan expatriate sportspeople in Switzerland
Expatriate footballers in Switzerland
Moroccan football managers
Difaâ Hassani El Jadidi managers
Botola managers